Albert Proud Robson (14 November 1916 – January 1990) was an English professional footballer who played in the Football League for Crystal Palace as a centre forward.

References 

English Football League players
English footballers
Association football forwards
People from Crook, County Durham
Footballers from County Durham
1916 births
1990 deaths
Crystal Palace F.C. players
Tunbridge Wells F.C. players
Guildford City F.C. players
Margate F.C. players
Southern Football League players
Clapton Orient F.C. wartime guest players
Brighton & Hove Albion F.C. wartime guest players